Frits Pirard (Breda, 8 December 1954) was a Dutch professional road bicycle racer. Pirard won stage 1 of the 1983 Tour de France. He also competed in the team time trial event at the 1976 Summer Olympics.

Major results

1975
Ster van Zwolle
1978
Ronde van Midden-Nederland
1979
GP Ouest-France
 National 50 km Track Championship
1982
Ulvenhout
Heusden
1983
Draai van de Kaai
Zwijndrecht
Tour de France:
Winner stage 1
Huijbergen
1985
Dongen
1986
 National Track Points Race Championship
1987
GP UC Bessèges

See also 
 List of Dutch Olympic cyclists

References

External links 

Official Tour de France results for Frits Pirard

Dutch male cyclists
1954 births
Living people
Dutch Tour de France stage winners
Sportspeople from Breda
Olympic cyclists of the Netherlands
Cyclists at the 1976 Summer Olympics
Cyclists from North Brabant